Virginia's 10th House of Delegates district elects one of the 100 members of the Virginia House of Delegates, the lower house of the state's bicameral legislature. The district includes portions of Clarke, Frederick, and Loudoun counties. The district's representative is Wendy Gooditis.

Electoral history

2017 
In the 2017 general election, Democrat Wendy Gooditis challenged incumbent Republican Randy Minchew; she won by almost 4%.

2019 
In 2019, the same candidates faced off again, with each raising more than a million dollars for the race. Gooditis won by roughly 5%.

District officeholders

References

010
Clarke County, Virginia
Frederick County, Virginia
Government in Loudoun County, Virginia